Hyeonjeo-dong is a legal dong, neighbourhood of the Seodaemun-gu district in Seoul, South Korea and is governed by its administrative dong, Cheonyeon-dong's office. There are in the Historic Sites "Dongnimmun (Independence Gate)" and Yeongeunmunjucho (Plinths of Yeongeunmun Gate).

See also 
 Administrative divisions of South Korea

References

External links 
 Seodaemun-gu Official site in English
 Map of Seodaemun-gu
  Seodaemun-gu Official website

Neighbourhoods of Seodaemun District